The Dust Bowl was a period of severe dust storms during the 1930s Depression Era.

Dust Bowl may also refer to:
 The Dust Bowl (film), a 2012 PBS documentary on the Dust Bowl directed by Ken Burns
 Dustbowl (album), a 1988 album by Head of David
 Dust Bowl (album), by Joe Bonamassa

See also